Saji Thomas is an Indian rower from Aleppey, Kerala. Thomas was a participant in three Asian Games and World championships. His teams won 13 medals in various international competitions. He won medals in all main boat classes of both sweep rowing and sculling in major regattas, the only Indian with this achievement. The Arjuna Award was conferred on him by the Government of India in 2014.

 Event: M4-, M8+, LM2x, LM4x
LM4-, LM8+, M2x, M2-, M1x

References 

Indian male rowers
Living people
Year of birth missing (living people)
Asian Games medalists in rowing
Rowers at the 2002 Asian Games
Rowers at the 2010 Asian Games
Asian Games silver medalists for India
Medalists at the 2010 Asian Games
Recipients of the Arjuna Award
People from Alappuzha district

4. Saji